Marsaxlokk Ground is a football pitch in Marsaxlokk, a traditional fishing village located in the south-eastern part of Malta. The ground is used mostly for football matches and is the home stadium of Marsaxlokk Football Club. Marsaxlokk FC uses this ground for training and practice matches.

Marsaxlokk would play their European games at the ground, but the club play their league matches at the Ta' Qali National Stadium, since most of the Maltese Premier League matches are played there, and also because the ground has a very low capacity.

Football venues in Malta
Marsaxlokk
Marsaxlokk F.C.